Hispanic Link News Service is an American English-language Hispanic-oriented weekly news briefing founded in 1979 by Charlie Ericksen and his wife Sebastiana Mendoza in Washington D.C. It is distributed through the Los Angeles Times. .

References

1979 establishments in the United States
Defunct magazines published in the United States
Magazines established in 1979
Magazines with year of disestablishment missing
Magazines published in Washington, D.C.
Newspaper supplements
News magazines published in the United States
Weekly magazines published in the United States